Edward “Eddie” MacLaine (April 11, 1899 – June 14, 1972) was a Scottish-Canadian soccer player who earned two caps with Canada in 1925 and 1926.  He played professionally in Canada and the American Soccer League. He was 73 years old when he died on June 14, 1972.

Player

Club
MacLaine began his career in his native Scotland with Albion Rovers, Dykehead and Mid-Annandale. In 1924, he moved to Canada where he played for four teams: Grenadier Guards, Montreal Maroons, Montreal Carsteel and Montreal Vickers. He briefly moved south to join Providence of the American Soccer League.  In his first year in the league, he scored twenty-one goals in thirty-two league games. In 1927, he began the season with Providence, played three games, then left the team to return to Canada. After his return, he played for Carsteel in 1930 and 1931. In 1931, Montreal Carsteel went to the finals of the National Soccer League; Although McLaine scored two goals, Carsteel fell to Toronto Scottish.

International
On June 27, 1926, MacLaine scored the only goal as Canada defeated the United States.

Executive
In 1950, MacLaine was the vice-president of the Quebec Soccer Federation.

References

External links
 
 

1890s births
1972 deaths
Footballers from Coatbridge
Albion Rovers F.C. players
Dykehead F.C. players
Mid-Annandale F.C. players
Scottish Football League players
American Soccer League (1921–1933) players
Canadian soccer players
Canadian expatriate soccer players
Expatriate soccer players in the United States
Canada men's international soccer players
Montreal Carsteel players
Montreal Maroons (soccer) players
Providence Clamdiggers players
Association football forwards
British emigrants to Canada
Soccer people from Quebec
Anglophone Quebec people
Canadian expatriate sportspeople in the United States
Canadian National Soccer League players